The following highways are numbered 104B:

United States
 New York State Route 104B
 Vermont Route 104B (former)

See also
List of highways numbered 104
List of highways numbered 104A